Faiz Muhammad Manahi Halt railway station (Sindhi: فيض محمد مناهي هالٽ ريلوي اسٽيشن) is located on the now dismantled Tando Adam–Mehrabpur Branch Line in Manahi, Sindh, Pakistan.

See also
 List of railway stations in Pakistan
 Pakistan Railways

References

External links

Railway stations in Sindh